Sven Montag is a German sprint canoer who competed in the early 1990s. He won two medals at the 1991 ICF Canoe Sprint World Championships in Paris with a silver in the C-4 1000 m and a bronze in the C-4 500 m events.

References

German male canoeists
Living people
Year of birth missing (living people)
ICF Canoe Sprint World Championships medalists in Canadian